The 2003 Gravesham Borough Council election took place on 1 May 2003 to elect members of Gravesham Borough Council in Kent, England. The whole council was up for election with boundary changes since the last election in 1999. The Labour Party stayed in overall control of the council.

Election result
Overall turnout at the election was 31%.

Ward results

References

2003 English local elections
2003
2000s in Kent